Hezekiah ben Manoah, or Hezekiah bar Manoah, was a French rabbi and Bible commentator of the 13th century. He is generally known by the title of his commentary, Chizkuni.

In memory of his father, who lost his right hand through his steadfastness in the faith, Hezekiah wrote a commentary on the Pentateuch, under the title Ḥazzeḳuni (ca. 1240). It was printed at Venice in 1524. Other editions appeared at Cremona (1559), Amsterdam (1724, in the Rabbinical Bible of M. Frankfurter), Lemberg (1859), etc.

The commentary is based principally upon Rashi, but it uses also about twenty other commentaries, though the author quotes as his sources only Rashi, Dunash ben Labrat, the "Yosippon", and a Sefer haToladot (which may be the work mentioned in the Tosafot's commentary to ). Hezekiah stated in his work that the lack of citations was to avoid bias and "glorify the great with the small". In addition to commentaries, he also contributed original analysis in the form of psychological profiles and historical analysis.

References

 Its bibliography:
Fürst, Bibl. Jud. i.171;
Zunz, Z.G. p. 91;
Steinschneider, Cat. Bodl. p. 844;
Catalogus Monacensis, p. 79;
Benjacob, Oẓar ha-Sefarim, p. 173;
Winter and Wünsche, Die Jüd. Litteratur, ii.332;
Renan, in L'Histoire Littéraire de la France, xxvii.436.

13th-century French rabbis
French Orthodox rabbis
Bible commentators